For other films, see Dost (disambiguation)

Dost is a 1974 Hindi film. Produced by Premji, it was directed by Dulal Guha. The film stars Dharmendra, Hema Malini, Shatrughan Sinha, Asit Sen and Rehman. Amitabh Bachchan makes a guest appearance. The film's music is by Laxmikant Pyarelal.

Plot
Maanav is an orphan who was brought up by a Catholic Priest, Father Francis. After completing his M.A. he returns home to Taran Devi and finds out that his mentor is dead. He re-locates to Bombay by train, and a man named Gopichand Sharma attempts to steal his luggage, but Maanav chases him and retrieves it. The men become friends, despite of their differences - Maanav wants to lead an honest life, and Gopichand, who is estranged from his wife, a nurse, Kalyani, and son, Munna, is an alcoholic and thief. Gopichand eventually changes his lifestyle, decides to be honest, patches up with his family, but ends up antagonizing his crime boss, Monto Sardar, who chops off his right hand. Maanav gets him a job with Hercules Milk Foods. Maanav meets with and falls in love with Kaajal Gupta, who is the daughter of the owner of Hercules Milk Foods, much to the chagrin of her father, who wants her to marry Shyamal. Then one day Maanav disappears from Gopichand and Kaajal's lives. He re-locates to Simla and it is here that he learns that things have spiraled out of control as Gopichand has been arrested for marketing contaminated milk powder resulting in the deaths of hundreds of children. Maanav decides to return to Bombay and attempts to make sense as to why Gopichand committed this crime.

Cast
 Dharmendra as Maanav
 Hema Malini as Kaajal "Kaju" Gupta
 Shatrughan Sinha as Gopichand "Gopi" Sharma
 Amitabh Bachchan as Anand (Guest Appearance)
 Ravindra Kapoor as Shyamal
  Kanhaiyalal (actor) as Gadibabu
 Anwar Hussain as Ustad Monto Sardar
 Abhi Bhattacharya as Father Francis
 Ramayan Tiwari as Gupta's ex-servant released from jail
 Kumari Naaz as Kalyani Sharma
 Master Bunty as Munna Sharma
 Raju as Rajesh "Raju" Gupta
 Maruti Rao as Akbar
 Rehman as Mr. Gupta (Kaajal's father)
 H. L. Pardesi as Petty Thief
 Heena Kausar as Bindu (as Hina Kausar)
 Raj Mehra as Police Commissioner
 Asit Sen as the Police Inspector who arrested Kaajal
 Satyendra Kapoor as Father Rebello (as Satyendra Kapoor)
 Chand Usmani ina a guest appearance 
 Jagdish Raj as Police Inspector who paid visit to Mr. Gupta after Shyamal's death (uncredited)

Awards 

 22nd Filmfare Awards:

Nominated

 Best Supporting Actor – Shatrughan Sinha
 Best Lyricist – Anand Bakshi for "Gaadi Bula Rahi Hai"
 Best Male Playback Singer – Kishore Kumar for "Gaadi Bula Rahi Hai"

Soundtrack

External links 

 

1974 films
Indian crime films
1970s Hindi-language films
Films scored by Laxmikant–Pyarelal
Films directed by Dulal Guha
Hindi-language crime films